Nationalist terrorism is a form of terrorism motivated by nationalism (often ultranationalism). Nationalist terrorists seek to form self-determination in some form, which may take the form of gaining greater autonomy, establishing a completely independent sovereign state (separatism), or joining another existing sovereign state with which the nationalists identify (irredentism). Nationalist terrorists often oppose what they consider to be occupying, imperial, or otherwise illegitimate powers.

Nationalist terrorism is linked to a national, ethnic, religious, or other identifying group, and the feeling among members of that group that they are oppressed or denied rights, especially rights accorded to others.

As with the concept of terrorism itself, the term "nationalist terrorism" and its application are highly contentious issues. What constitutes an illegitimate regime and what types of violence and war are acceptable against such a state are subjects of debate. Groups described by some as "nationalist terrorists" tend to consider themselves "freedom fighters", engaged in valid but asymmetric warfare.

Other nationalistic terrorism can include violence against immigrants in a country. Nationalists in many countries see immigration as a threat to the prosperity of the local or native population of that country.

List

The following are nationalist groups, which in some circles have been deemed "terrorist":
Grey Wolves
Balochistan Liberation Army (BLA)
 Khalistani groups
ETA
EOKA
Partiya Karkerên Kurdistan (PKK)
Armenian Secret Army for the Liberation of Armenia (ASALA)
Front de libération du Québec  (FLQ)
Provisional Irish Republican Army  (IRA)
People's Mujahedin of Iran (MKO)
Tamil Tigers (LTTE)
Ukrainian Insurgent Army (UPA)
Wawelberg Group
Lehi
Irgun
Chetniks
Ustashe
Palestine Liberation Organization (PLO)
National Bolshevik Front (NBF)
Kosovo Liberation Army (UÇK)

The label of a group as carrying out "nationalist terrorism" does not preclude it being described in other terms:
Nationalist terrorism may overlap with religiously-motivated terrorism, so Palestinian nationalist militant/terrorist groups are also sometimes Islamic (Hamas, Palestinian Islamic Jihad), and Zionist groups are also sometimes Jewish (Kach and Kahane Chai, Gush Emunim Underground).
Nationalist terrorism may also be identified with the left wing (for example, Democratic Front for the Liberation of Palestine, ETA, Shining Path) or the right wing (AUC, Sombra Negra)

Northern Ireland
The "Troubles" in Northern Ireland (1968–) is characterised by the competing nationalist claims of the two communities there:

The mainly Roman Catholic Irish republicans or nationalists community, mainly descended from the native Irish inhabitants, identify as Irish and want the six counties of Northern Ireland, currently part of the United Kingdom to leave the UK and unite with the Republic of Ireland. Paramilitary groups associated with this ideology include:

Irish Republican Army (1922–62) A split from the "old" IRA that opposed the Anglo-Irish Treaty that solidified the partition of Ireland following the Irish War of Independence. Largely ineffective, petered out in the late 1950s and was officially ended in February 1962.
Official IRA (1969–72) Although formally on ceasefire, except for "defensive actions", since 1972. The Official IRA continued some attacks on British forces up to mid 1973, killing seven British soldiers in what it termed "retaliatory attacks". No longer an active organization.
Irish National Liberation Army (1972–1998). Small Marxist group – a split from the Official IRA. The INLA declared a ceasefire on 22 August 1998.
Provisional Irish Republican Army (PIRA) (1969–2005). It is currently on ceasefire and has destroyed most of its weaponry. Ihe Independent Monitoring Commission (IMC), in its latest report, dated April 2006, points out that it has no reason to disbelieve the PIRA or information to suspect that the group has not fully decommissioned. Rather it indicated that any weaponry that had not been handed in had been retained by individuals outside the PIRA's control. It was a splinter group of the Official IRA. Supporters of the PIRA split from Official Sinn Féin to form Provisional Sinn Féin. Provisional Sinn Féin was later known simply as Sinn Féin while 'Official' Sinn Féin eventually became the Democratic Left.
 Continuity Irish Republican Army (CIRA) (1986–present). Also known as the "Continuity Army Council" and "Óglaigh na hÉireann (Irish for 'Volunteers of Ireland'). It is not on ceasefire.
 Real Irish Republican Army (RIRA) (1997–present). Also known as the True IRA and Óglaigh na hÉireann (Irish for Volunteers of Ireland). It is not on ceasefire.

The other community is overwhelmingly Protestant and are known as unionists or loyalists and are largely descended from Scottish and English settlers who arrived in Ulster during the Plantations of Ireland. This community, which forms a slight majority in Northern Ireland, regards itself as essentially British. Paramilitary groups associated with this ideology have received clandestine assistance from the British security forces in the past. Many of their victims have been civilian Catholics with no political connections.  These paramilitary groups include:
 Ulster Volunteer Force (1966–present). Officially on ceasefire, although the Northern Ireland Secretary Peter Hain announced that the British government no longer recognized the UVF ceasefire after serious loyalist rioting in 2005. UVF renounced "violence" and declared it was putting its arms "beyond reach" on 3 May 2007. The Red Hand Commando is a cover name for UVF.
 Loyalist Volunteer Force (1996–2005). The LVF announced in October 2005 that it was standing down following the IRA's previous standing down and disarmament. The Independent Monitoring Commission confirms that the LVF is keeping its paramilitary ceasefire, is heavily involved in organized crime and drug trafficking.
 Ulster Defence Association (UDA) (1971–present). Formed as an umbrella organisation of loyalist groups. Legal in the United Kingdom until 1992. Often used the name "Ulster Freedom Fighters" (UFF) when it wished to claim responsibility for attacks. On February 22, 2003, they announced a "complete and utter cessation" of all acts of violence for one year. It said it will review its ceasefire every three months, in February 2006, the Independent Monitoring Commission reported that the UDA continued its paramilitary activities, as well as involvement in organized crime, drug trafficking, counterfeiting, extortion, money laundering and robbery. On 11 November 2007, the UDA formally renounced violence, but a commander said the group would not surrender its weapons to international disarmament officials.
 Red Hand Defenders (1998–present). Opposes ceasefire.
 Orange Volunteers (1998–present) The group has not been active since 2000, when they declared a ceasefire. However, in February 2001, the group called off its ceasefire with a "Back to War" statement, but has not been thought to be active since then.

References

 
Chauvinism